Las Quintas is a colonia of Culiacán, Sinaloa.

External links
 H. Ayuntamiento de Culiacán — Official website
 Culiacán Travel Guide - Official website

References

Culiacán